The 9th AARP Movies for Grownups Awards, presented by AARP the Magazine, honored films released in 2009 made by people over the age of 50 and were announced on February 15, 2010. Robert De Niro was the winner of the annual Career Achievement Award, and LeVar Burton won the award for Breakthrough Achievement for his direction of Reach for Me.

Awards

Winners and Nominees

Winners are listed first, highlighted in boldface, and indicated with a double dagger.

Career Achievement Award
 Robert De Niro: "a film icon who has captivated audiences for decades with his stellar performances in films such as Taxi Driver, Raging Bull, Meet The Parents, and 2009’s Everybody's Fine."

Breakthrough Accomplishment
 LeVar Burton: "His first grownup theatrical film, the Emmy-winning actor tackles a story of love in a hospice facility. Guiding his stars Alfre Woodard and Seymour Cassel, he deftly avoids traps that could have led to maudlin sentimentality."

Films with multiple nominations and wins

References

AARP Movies for Grownups Awards
AARP